Riddle Education Center was a charter school in Riddle, Oregon, United States.  It closed in 2017.

Academics
In 2008, 58% of the school's seniors received their high school diploma. Of 12 students, 7 graduated, 3 dropped out, and 2 are still in high school.

References

High schools in Douglas County, Oregon
Charter schools in Oregon
Public middle schools in Oregon
Public high schools in Oregon